James Chaney (1943–1964) was one of three civil rights workers killed in Mississippi by members of the Ku Klux Klan.

James Chaney may also refer to:

 James E. Chaney (1885–1967), United States Army officer
 James M. Chaney (1921–1976), American police officer and witness to President Kennedy's assassination
 James McDonald Chaney, American Presbyterian minister
 Jim Chaney, American football coach and player